1989 Masters may refer to:
1989 Masters Tournament, golf
1989 Masters (snooker)
1989 Nabisco Masters, tennis